This is a list of all episodes of the television police drama series The District.

Series overview

Episodes

Season 1 (2000–01)

Season 2 (2001–02)

Season 3 (2002–03)

Season 4 (2003–04)

References

External links
 
 

Lists of American drama television series episodes